2 Win is an upcoming Italian and British motor racing film. Based on true events, the film depicts the rivalry between the teams driving Audi Quattro and Lancia 037 rally cars at the 1983 World Rally Championship. The film is directed by Stefano Mordini, with Daniel Brühl and Riccardo Scamarcio in starring roles as Roland Gumpert and Cesare Fiorio. The script was written by Filippo Bologna, Mordini, and Scarmarcio. Scarmarcio also produces, alongside Jeremy Thomas, for Recorded Picture Company, as well as Lebowski, HanWay Films and Metropolitan Films.

Synopsis
At the 1983 World Rally Championship team Audi Sport GmbH and the team Martini Racing develop a rivalry with the German outfit favourites for glory. Daniel Brühl and Riccardo Scamarcio play the key players Roland Gumpert (Bruhl) and Cesare Fiorio (Scamarcio).

Cast
 Daniel Brühl as Roland Gumpert
 Riccardo Scamarcio as Cesare Fiorio
 Volker Bruch as Walter Röhrl
 Katie Clarkson-Hill as Jane McCoy

Production
It is produced by Jeremy Thomas together with Riccardo Scamarcio. Lebowski is producing the film with Recorded Picture Company and Metropolitan Films co-producing. RAI is the Italian distributor. HanWay Films is handling worldwide sales. The film was taken to buyers on the Croisette at the Cannes Film Festival.

Filming
Filming locations include Italy and Greece, including some of the places where the events depicted took place, such as the Lancia office and the Circuito di Balocco. Principal photography started in Turin on May 16, 2022.

The film was marked as in post-production by August 6, 2022.

References

External links

Upcoming films
Italian sports drama films
British auto racing films
British biographical drama films
British sports drama films
Biographical action films
Biographical films about sportspeople
Cultural depictions of racing drivers 
Sports films based on actual events
Films set in Italy
Films shot in Italy
Films shot in Turin
Italian biographical films
English-language Italian films
Italian auto racing films
Films set in the 20th century